Peraiyur taluk is a taluk of Madurai district of the Indian state of Tamil Nadu. The headquarters of the taluk is the town of Peraiyur.

Demographics
According to the 2011 census, the taluk of Peraiyur had a population of 200,599 with 100,508 males and 100,091 females. There were 996 women for every 1,000 men. The taluk had a literacy rate of 35.47%. Child population in the age group below 6 years were 9,406 Males and 8,727 Females.

References 

Taluks of Madurai district